An employment agency is an organization which matches employers to employees. In developed countries, there are multiple private businesses which act as employment agencies and a publicly-funded employment agency.

Public employment agencies

One of the oldest references to a public employment agency was in 1650, when Henry Robinson proposed an "Office of Addresses and Encounters" that would link employers to workers. The British Parliament rejected the proposal, but he himself opened such a business, which was short-lived.

The idea to create public employment agencies as a way to fight unemployment was eventually adopted in developed countries by the beginning of the twentieth century.

In the United Kingdom, the first labour exchange was established by social reformer and employment campaigner Alsager Hay Hill in London in 1871. This was later augmented by officially sanctioned exchanges created by the Labour Bureau (London) Act 1902, which subsequently went nationwide, a movement prompted by the Liberal government through the Labour Exchanges Act 1909. The present public provider of job search help is called Jobcentre Plus.

In the United States, a federal programme of employment services was rolled out in the New Deal. The initial legislation was called the Wagner-Peyser Act of 1933 and more recently job services happen through one-stop centers established by the Workforce Investment Act of 1998.

In Australia, the first public employment service was set up in 1946, called the Commonwealth Employment Service.

Private employment agency
The first known private employment agency Robinson, Gabbitas & Thring, was founded in 1873 by John Gabbitas who recruited schoolmasters for public schools in England. In the United States, the first private employment agency was opened by Fred Winslow who started an Engineering Agency in 1893. It later became part of General Employment Enterprises who also owned Businessmen's Clearing House (est. 1902). Another of the oldest agencies was developed by Katharine Felton as a response to the problems brought on by the 1906 San Francisco earthquake and fire.

Status from the International Labour Organization
The International Labour Organization's first ever Recommendation was targeted at fee charging agencies. The Unemployment Recommendation, 1919 (No.1), Art. 1 called for each member to,
"take measures to prohibit the establishment of employment agencies which charge fees or which carry on their business for profit. Where such agencies already exist, it is further recommended that they be permitted to operate only under government licenses, and that all practicable measures be taken to abolish such agencies as soon as possible."

The Unemployment Convention, 1919, Art. 2 instead required the alternative of
"a system of free public employment agencies under the control of a central authority. Committees, which shall include representatives of employers and workers, shall be appointed to advise on matters concerning the carrying on of these agencies."

In 1933 the Fee-Charging Employment Agencies Convention (No.34) formally called for abolition. The exception was if the agencies were licensed and a fee scale was agreed in advance. In 1949 a new revised Convention (No.96) was produced. This kept the same scheme, but secured an 'opt out' (Art.2) for members that did not wish to sign up. Agencies were an increasingly entrenched part of the labor market. The United States did not sign up to the Conventions. The latest Convention, the Private Employment Agencies Convention, 1997 (No.181) takes a much softer stance and calls merely for regulation.

In most countries, agencies are regulated, for instance in the UK under the Employment Agencies Act 1973, or in Germany under the Arbeitnehmerüberlassungsgesetz (Employee Hiring Law of 1972).

Executive recruitment

An executive-search firm specializes in recruiting executive personnel for companies in various industries. This term may apply to job-search-consulting firms who charge job candidates a fee and who specialize in mid-to-upper-level executives. In the United States, some states require job-search-consulting firms to be licensed as employment agencies.

Some third-party recruiters work on their own, while others operate through an agency, acting as direct contacts between client companies and the job candidates they recruit.  They can specialize in client relationships only (sales or business development), in finding candidates (recruiting or sourcing), or in both areas.  Most recruiters tend to specialize in either permanent, full-time, direct-hire positions or in contract positions, but occasionally in more than one.  In an executive-search assignment, the employee-gaining client company – not the person being hired – pays the search firm its fee.

Executive agent
An executive agent is a type of agency that represents executives seeking senior executive positions which are often unadvertised. In the United Kingdom, almost all positions up to £ ($) a year are advertised and 50% of vacancies paying £ – £ are advertised. However, only 5% of positions which pay more than £ (with the exception of the public sector) are advertised and are often in the domain of around 4,000 executive recruiters in the United Kingdom.  Often such roles are unadvertised to maintain stakeholder confidence and to overcome internal uncertainties.

Staffing types
Contract, contract-to-hire, temporary, part-time, full-time, GAP staffing (graphic arts professional).

See also

Bundesagentur für Arbeit, German federal employment agency
Contingent workforce
Hiring hall
Human resource management
Olsen v. Nebraska, a US legal case concerning compensation issues with private employment agencies
Payrolling
Personnel selection
Professional employer organization
Recruitment
Talent agent
Temporary work
UK agency worker law

References

Further reading

DE Balducchi, RW Eberts, CJ O'Leary (eds), Labour Exchange Policy in the United States (W.E. Upjohn Institute for Employment Research 2004)
P Craig, M Freedland, C Jacqueson and N Kountouris, Public Employment Services and European Law (2007)
International Labour Office, The role of private employment agencies in the functioning of labour markets (Report VI 1994) International Labour Conference 81st Session
R Kellogg, The United States Employment Service (University of Chicago Press 1933)
T Martinez, The Human Marketplace: An Examination of Private Employment Agencies (Transaction 1976)
JB Seymour, The British Employment Exchange (PS King & Son 1928)

Recruitment
 
Public employment service